General elections were held in Palau on 4 November 1980 to elect a President, Vice-President, Senate and House of Delegates. All candidates ran as independents. Haruo Remeliik won the election for President with 31.2% of the vote, whilst Alfonso Oiterong was elected Vice-President. Voter turnout was 80%.

Results

President

Vice-President

Senate

House of Delegates

Elected Congress members

Aftermath
Following the elections, Haruo Remeliik and Alfonso Oiterong were sworn in as President and Vice President on 1 January 1981. Kaleb Udui was elected President of the Senate, with Carlos Salii elected Speaker of the House of Delegates.

References

Palau
General
Elections in Palau
Non-partisan elections
Presidential elections in Palau